At 11am on 17 May 1973, a hand grenade was thrown at Milan's police headquarters in Lombardy, Italy. It happened during a memorial ceremony there for police officer Luigi Calabresi, who had been shot dead in Milan a year earlier. Four civilians were killed by the blast and 45 other people were injured. 

The attacker was Gianfranco Bertoli (30 April 1933 – 17 December 2000), who self-identified as an anarchist was later identified to be a long time informant for the Italian military intelligence service, that he had long maintained links with various anti‐communist and neo‐fascist organizations linked to the Operation Gladio stay behind network as part of the strategy of tension. He was arrested at the scene and in 1975 was convicted in relation to the attack and sentenced to life imprisonment. The attack was denounced by various anarchist organizations including Italian Anarchist Federation in a press release almost instantly.

References

Police headquarters bombing
1973 murders in Italy
1970s trials
20th-century mass murder in Italy
Attacks on buildings and structures in 1973
Attacks on buildings and structures in Italy
Attacks on police stations in the 1970s
False flag operations
Crime in Lombardy
Explosions in 1973
Explosions in Italy 
Grenade attacks
May 1973 crimes
May 1973 events in Europe
Murder trials
Terrorist incidents in Italy in 1973
Trials in Italy
Years of Lead (Italy)
Building bombings in Europe